Meri Saheli is India's best-selling women's Hindi magazine. Spearheaded by veteran actress and public figure, Hema Malini, this title has carved a niche for itself in the hearts of its patrons. The Mumbai-based title is published by Pioneer Book Company Pvt Ltd.

History and profile
Meri Saheli is known for its women-oriented, strong and powerful content that aims to touch every aspect that matters to the womenfolk.  The magazine has established itself as the torchbearer of feminine growth and changing times; it encourages women to follow their dreams and embrace their new-fangled roles with élan. Meri Saheli has been like a guiding force and aims to herald every Indian woman into a confident and happy life.

The magazine is renowned to be a progressive one, focussing not just on fashion, beauty, and relationships but also on finance, careers and education. Meri Saheli believes in helping women build a conducive environment for success and happiness of the entire community. It encourages them to adopt new thinking and concepts, without compromising on our culture's good values and rich traditions.

Issue by issue, Meri Saheli comes loaded with informative, liberal content, with only one agenda—catalysing the growth and development of women, in not just the metros but all over India.

References

External links
Official website
https://www.examsselection.com/meri-saheli/

1987 establishments in Maharashtra
Hindi-language magazines
Monthly magazines published in India
Women's magazines published in India
Magazines established in 1987
Mass media in Mumbai